Kahriz (also Romanized as Kahrīz and Kārīz; also known as Kahrīz-e Safīd) is a village in Japelaq-e Gharbi Rural District, Japelaq District, Azna County, Lorestan Province, Iran. At the 2006 census, its population was 361, in 89 families.

References 

Towns and villages in Azna County